"Ddu-Du Ddu-Du" (RR: ttuduttudu) is a song recorded in Korean and Japanese by South Korean girl group Blackpink. It was released on June 15, 2018, through YG Entertainment, in conjunction with the release of the group's first Korean-language extended play, Square Up. The Japanese version of the single was released through YGEX on August 22, 2018, and was distributed in three physical formats. Described as a pop rap song infused with trap beats and bubblegum pop sounds, the track was written by YG collaborator Teddy Park, whilst production and composition were handled by Park, 24, Bekuh Boom and R.Tee.

"Ddu-Du Ddu-Du" was a commercial success in South Korea, peaking atop the Gaon Digital Chart for three consecutive weeks, marking Blackpink's second number-one single in the country. The song also topped the national charts in Singapore and Malaysia, in addition to peaking atop the Billboard K-pop Hot 100 and World Digital Songs charts. The song was certified double platinum for streaming and platinum for digital sales by the Korea Music Content Association (KMCA), and was further certified gold in the United States and Japan and silver in the United Kingdom.

Its accompanying music video was uploaded to the group's official YouTube channel on the same day and soon became the most viewed online video in the first 24 hours by a Korean act, and the second most watched music video of all time within 24 hours. It has since become the first music video by a K-pop group to reach 1 billion as well as 2 billion views, and it is currently the most-viewed music video by a K-pop group on YouTube. It was named as the Song of the Year through the public survey conducted by Gallup Korea in 2018.

Background and release 
On June 4, 2018, YG Entertainment confirmed via YG Life that Blackpink will release their debut Korean-language mini-album Square Up on June 15, with "Ddu-Du Ddu-Du" serving as the title track. It marked the group's first original release in one year, since "As If It's Your Last" in June 2017. The name of the track attracted attention from fans due to the song's name being reminiscent of an onomatopoeia, and sparked curiosity regarding its genre and concept. Following a series of concept photos and teasers, Blackpink were reported saying, "as it is our debut mini-album and comeback after one year, we prepared each song with a lot of sincerity and affection." Additionally, member Jennie commented, "I am confident and I look forward to our comeback. I am happy to be able to express the musicality of Blackpink in various ways."

"Ddu-Du Ddu-Du" was released via digital download and streaming on June 15, 2018, in conjunction with Square Up. It was written and produced by Teddy Park and co-produced by Park, Bekuh Boom, 24 and R.Tee. On August 17, YGEX announced that a Japanese version of the track would be released as the group's debut single in Japan on August 22. It was subsequently distributed in three physical formats: a CD-only regular edition, limited edition CD+DVD, and CD edition featuring each member. The regular and limited editions includes all the tracks from Square Up, in addition to the Japanese version of the single.

Composition
The track has been described as a "fierce Pop-rap track overflowing with charisma" that "features a prominent trap beat" infused with bubblegum pop sounds. It combines instrumentations of oriental percussion rhythms and whistling on top of the bassline.

Commercial performance 
In South Korea, "Ddu-Du Ddu-Du" debuted at number three on the Gaon Digital Chart for the week of June 16. The following week, the song ascended to the number one position, making it Blackpink's second number-one single in the country. It broke the highest weekly points in the Gaon Digital Chart, previously held by labelmate Big Bang with the single "Flower Road". It remained atop the chart for three weeks and subsequently spent over 50 weeks in the top 100. It was then certified platinum for both download and streaming by the Korea Music Content Association (KMCA) for 100 million streams on November 8, 2018, and 2.5 million digital sales on April 11, 2019. The Japanese version of the single debuted at number 6 on the Japanese Oricon Daily Singles Chart and peaked at number 2 six days later, selling 3,725 units. On the chart's weekly counterpart, the song debuted at number 7 and sold 24,385 copies. The song was certified gold for 50 million streams by the Recording Industry Association of Japan (RIAJ) in July 2021.

In the United States, "Ddu-Du Ddu-Du" debuted and peaked at number 55 on the US Billboard Hot 100 on June 30, 2018, simultaneously becoming the highest-charting song by a Korean girl group on the chart; breaking the record previously held by Wonder Girls' "Nobody" (2008). Within its first week, the song accumulated 12.4 million streams and sold more than 7,000 digital units in the country. According to Nielsen, the song received 113 million on-demand streams in 2018. On August 23, 2019, the song was certified gold by the Recording Industry Association of America (RIAA), for track equivalent sales of 500,000 units, thus becoming the first Korean girl group and third Korean artist overall to receive the certification, after Psy and BTS. In Canada, "Ddu-Du Ddu-Du" debuted at number 22 on the Canadian Hot 100 and remained on the chart for ten weeks. In Europe, the song peaked at number 32 on the Scottish Singles and Albums Charts and number 78 on the UK Singles Chart. The track reached 13.7 million streams in the UK as of April 2019, and 45.5 million streams as of September 2022, becoming the group's most-streamed song in the country. In June 2021, the song was awarded a silver certification in the country by the British Phonographic Industry (BPI) for track-equivalent sales of 200,000 units.

Critical reception
"Ddu-Du Ddu-Du" was met with mixed to positive reviews from music critics. Hwang Seon-up from Korean webzine IZM gave it a 3.5/5 rating, where he said the "ordinary trap beat" was unexpectedly met with the instrumentations of the synths, where it made "the sense of creating a climax with the drop of 'Ddu-Du Ddu-Du' ... outstanding." Writing for The 405, Chase McMullen called the song boisterous and "beautifully ludicrous", and referred to the chorus as "essentially nonsense". He wrote that "what's being said [is] less important than how they say it, building strength on irresistible cadences, verses, whether sung or rapped, flowing seamlessly. Jeff Benjamin for Paper praised the song's musical production and ranked the track number 13 in their list of Top 20 K-Pop Songs of 2018, commenting that the song "struck the right balance between hard hip-hop, honeyed harmonies and hazy-EDM hubbub." Furthermore, Benjamin added that "from the opening shoutout of their group name, Blackpink delivers one of the year's strongest anthems."

Rhian Daly from NME ranked "Ddu-Du Ddu-Du" the best song in the group's discography in May 2019, writing that the "it's a no-holds-barred, powerful anthem packed full of supreme self-confidence and swagger." In December 2019, Taylor Glasby of British GQ named the song the highlight of K-pop in 2018, in addition to being one of the game-changers from a decade of K-pop. Glasby wrote that the song "looked exactly as brilliant as OTT K-pop should, there was that hooky title refrain, the rappers injected sly confidence on the verses and an emotional build into the chorus gave the vocalists space to power up." Business Insiders Palmer Haasch, however, was unfavorable towards the song, writing in 2020 that it "is dramatic and filled to the brim with confidence, but it doesn't have the same kind of thematic substance as tracks like 'Kill This Love', despite following a similar structure." Haasch further added that the "bridge and final bars don't feel like a particularly satisfying conclusion".

In a selection by 35 music experts curated by Melon and newspaper Seoul Shinmun ranking the top 100 K-pop songs of all-time, "Ddu-Du Ddu-Du" ranked at number 13, with KBS Radio director Soyeon Kang writing that "the pink flame" which is embodied by the song "has fired a signal as a K-pop girl group that the world is paying attention to". Kang noted Blackpink's record breaking success and said that the "energetic song development based on EDM trap beats" along with its strong hooks establishes the identity of Blackpink, and at the same time showed the potential of how far they could go in the future.

Accolades

Music video 

The music video for "Ddu-Du Ddu-Du" was uploaded to the group's official YouTube channel on June 15 in conjunction with the release of the single. It soon became the most viewed online video in the first 24 hours by a Korean act, and the second most watched music video of all time with more than 36.2 million views within 24 hours after release, surpassing Psy's "Gentleman" (2013) and second only to Taylor Swift's "Look What You Made Me Do" (2017). The music video hit 100 million views in 10 days, making “Ddu-Du Ddu-Du” the only music video by an all-female group to achieve the feat within the timeframe. In November 2018, five months after release, it became the fastest music video by a K-pop group to reach 500 million views and the fifth most viewed K-pop video of all time at the time. Rolling Stone named it the eighth best music video of 2018, describing it as "a feat of bonkers, maximalist creativity that includes the best use of a tank in a music video since Master P's "Make 'Em Say Uhh!" (1998). A dance practice video for the song was released on June 18.

On January 21, 2019, the video became the most-viewed music video by a K-pop group on YouTube, with 620.9 million views; the video averaged 2.5 million views per day since its release, with 1.95 million daily views in January 2019. On November 11, 2019, the music video surpassed 1 billion views, making Blackpink the first K-pop group, second girl group, and fourth music group overall to achieve the milestone. The video subsequently surpassed 2 billion views on January 4, 2023, making it the first K-pop group video to achieve the milestone, and the second K-pop video overall to achieve the feat, after "Gangnam Style" (2012) by Psy.

Live performances
As part of promotions for Square Up, Blackpink premiered the song on live television along with "Forever Young" on Show! Music Core on June 16, 2018. Osen contrasted the "refreshing and melodic" performance of "Forever Young" with the strong hip-hop concept of "Ddu-Du Ddu-Du". They subsequently appeared on Inkigayo for the first time the next day. On June 22, the group was slated to perform the track at the Lotte Duty Free Family Concert 2018, however after several songs, their performance was abruptly halted before having a chance to perform "Ddu-Du Ddu-Du" due to "safety concerns". Fans expressed discontent regarding the handling of the situation as many in the audience paid tickets to see the group and they did not return after being escorted off the stage. The event organizers soon apologized for the incident.

"Ddu-Du Ddu-Du" was included on the set lists for the group's two headlining concert tours—the Blackpink Arena Tour 2018 and In Your Area World Tour (2018–20), where the song was used as the opening number. They also performed the song at the TGC Kitakyushu 2018 festival by Tokyo Girls Collection in Kitakyushu, Japan on October 6, and the SBS Super Concert in Suwon on October 14. On December 1, 2018, Blackpink performed it live at the 2018 Melon Music Awards where they won the award for best female dance performance. On December 25, Jennie performed her single "Solo" at the annual SBS Gayo Daejeon before reuniting with the rest of the members for the performance of "Ddu-Du Ddu-Du" and "Forever Young".

In January 2019, the group made performances with the song at the 33rd Golden Disc Awards and the 8th Gaon Chart Music Awards. On February 9, the group performed in the United States for the first time at Universal Music's Grammy Artist Showcase with "Ddu-Du Ddu-Du" and "Forever Young". On February 11, Blackpink made their American television debut in New York City on The Late Show with Stephen Colbert; their performance on the show coincided with the 55th anniversary of The Beatles' American television debut at the same theater. They also made a performance with the song on Good Morning America the following day. At the April 2019 Coachella Festival in Indio, California, "Ddu-Du Ddu-Du" was also used for the opening performance. On January 31, 2021, the group performed the song as part of their set list for their virtual concert The Show; the stage was decorated with a display of fire and pyrotechnics and was transformed into a shallow pool. Teen Vogue wrote that the performance was "one of the greatest spectacles of the concert". Billboard said that "the fire and water elements shine", and wrote that they brought out "some of their most intricate choreography of the entire show."

Other usage
The song was featured in the fourth episode of season three of Freeform series The Bold Type in April 2019 and the fifth episode of the tvN television series Mr. Queen in December 2020. South Korean boy band Stray Kids performed "God's Ddu-Du Ddu-Du", a Deadpool-themed mashup of "Ddu-Du Ddu-Du" with their own song "God's Menu," in the 2021 Mnet competition show Kingdom: Legendary War.

Track listing

Chart performance

Weekly charts

Monthly charts

Year-end charts

Sales and certifications

|-

Release history

See also

 List of certified songs in South Korea
 List of Gaon Digital Chart number ones of 2018
 List of Inkigayo Chart winners (2018)
 List of K-pop songs on the Billboard charts
 List of Kpop Hot 100 number ones
 List of most-viewed online videos in the first 24 hours
 List of M Countdown Chart winners (2018)
 List of number-one songs of 2018 (Malaysia)
 List of number-one songs of 2018 (Singapore)

References

2018 singles
2018 songs
Blackpink songs
Gaon Digital Chart number-one singles
Number-one singles in Malaysia
Number-one singles in Singapore
Songs written by Teddy Park
YG Entertainment singles
Billboard Korea K-Pop number-one singles